

The Arrow Model F or the Arrow Sport V-8 was a two-seat low-wing braced monoplane aircraft built in the United States between 1934 and 1938. It was built originally to a request by the US Bureau of Air Commerce to investigate the feasibility of using automobile engines to power aircraft. Accordingly, the Model F was fitted with a modified Ford V8 engine. Like the Arrow Sport before it, the Model F seated its pilot and passenger side-by-side in an open cockpit and was marketed for $1500.

Development
The Arrow Sport F was specifically built to accommodate the low-cost, yet heavy Arrow F V-8 engine, an aircraft modification of the Ford V-8. The engine was designed by Ford Engineer David E. Anderson with an aluminum oil pan, aluminum cylinders, and a 2:1 gear reduction to drive the prop at reasonable rpm ranges. The engine weighed 402 lbs for 85 hp vrs 182 lbs for an equivalent Continental aircraft engine.

Variants
Arrow Sport F Master – Open cockpit
Arrow Sport F Coupe – Closed cockpit variant 
Arrow Sport F De Lux Coupe – Closed cockpit with advanced instruments.
Arrow Sport M - Open cockpit with a Menasco Pirate engine.

Survivors
 A preserved Sport F Master (ex-NC18722, serial 85) is on display at San Francisco International Airport's Terminal 3.
 A disassembled Sport F is being rebuilt by the Dakota Territory Air Museum in North Dakota.
 A Sport M (N18764, serial 105) is private ownership.
 Two Sport F's (N17093, serial 13 & N18765, serial 106) preserved at the Western Antique Aeroplane & Automobile Museum in Oregon.
 A Sport F (N18018, serial 31) in private ownership in California.
 A 1936 Sport Model F (NC16470 Serial 2) preserved at the Mid Atlantic Air Museum at Reading Regional Airport in Reading, Pennsylvania. 
 A disassembled Sport F (N18000) is being rebuilt by The Nebraska Chapter of the Antique Airplane Association in Hastings Nebraska

Specifications

References

External links

 aerofiles.com

See also

1930s United States sport aircraft
Low-wing aircraft
Single-engined tractor aircraft
Model F
Aircraft first flown in 1934